The Faculty of Business and Economics is one of the 10 primary faculties at Monash University.

The Faculty is made up of two distinct schools – Monash Business School located in Melbourne, Australia and the School of Business at Monash University Malaysia. In addition, the Faculty runs specialist business units and courses at Monash Suzhou in China, the Monash Prato Centre in Italy and Monash Indonesia, located in Jakarta.

Collectively the Faculty of Business and Economics is home to over 21,600 students. It offers undergraduate, graduate and research degrees, with different options available at the different Monash locations.

History
The current Faculty structure is the result of the amalgamation of the Monash University Faculty of Economics and Politics, based at the University's Clayton campus, and the David Syme Business School, based at what is now the University's Caulfield campus. Monash University Malaysia School of Business was included as part of the Faculty in 1998 and in 2014, Monash Business School was created to encompass all Australian-based operations. Teaching of business degrees commenced at Monash Suzhou in 2020 and Monash Indonesia in 2021.

Rankings 
The Faculty of Business and Economics is internationally recognised for excellence in research and education in Australia, the Asia-Pacific and around the world.

Rankings by some of the most prestigious and highly regarded international rankings of world universities include the following:

 No. 4 in Australia for Business and Economics
 No. 1 in Australia and No. 17 in the world for Business Administration
 No. 2 in Australia and No. 42 in the world for Economics
 No. 3 in Oceania and No. 73 in the world for MBA

Monash Business School, Australia 
Monash Business School operates on three of Monash University’s four campuses in and around the city of Melbourne – Clayton, Caulfield and Peninsula. It is structured into seven discipline-based departments, together with four research centres and a Leadership and Executive Education group that is responsible for delivery of The Monash MBA, the Global Executive MBA and a range of Executive Education programs. The School also delivers a wide range of single and double coursework undergraduate and graduate programs, as well as research degrees.

Departments and Centres 

 Department of Accounting
 Department of Banking and Finance
 Department of Business Law and Taxation
 Department of Econometrics and Business Statistics
 Department of Economics
 Department of Management
 Department of Marketing
 Centre for Development Economics and Sustainability (CDES)
 Centre for Global Business (CGB)
 Centre for Health Economics (CHE)
 Monash Centre for Financial Studies (MCFS)
 Leadership and Executive Education

Accreditation 
Monash Business School is one of only 97 business schools in the world - and the only institution within Victoria - to have achieved 'Triple Accreditation' by the three global accrediting bodies: the Association to Advance Collegiate Schools of Business (AACSB); EFMD Quality Improvement System (EQUIS); and the Association of MBAs AMBA).

School of Business, Monash University Malaysia 
The School of Business is one of eight schools at Monash University Malaysia which was the first foreign university campus in Malaysia. Home to over 8,400 students from 78 different countries, Monash University Malaysia has established strong links with industry and government and serves as a platform for research and education engagement across Southeast Asia and beyond.

The School of Business is structured into seven discipline-based departments. The undergraduate program is anchored around the Bachelor of Business and Commerce and the graduate offering includes the Master of International Business (coursework) and the Doctor of Philosophy (research).

Departments 

 Department of Accounting 
 Department of Banking and Finance 
 Department of Business Law and Taxation 
 Department of Econometrics and Business Statistics 
 Department of Economics 
 Department of Management 
 Department of Marketing

Accreditation 
Monash University Malaysia School of Business is one of the few business schools in Malaysia to be accredited by the Association to Advance Collegiate Schools of Business (AACSB) which is the longest standing, most recognised form of specialised/professional accreditation an institution and its business programs can earn worldwide.

Academic leadership

Leadership team 

 Professor Simon Wilkie, Dean, Faculty of Business and Economics and Head, Monash Business School
 Professor Pervaiz K Ahmed, Head, School of Business (Malaysia)
Professor Michelle Welsh, Senior Deputy Dean, Faculty Operations
Professor Robert Brooks, Deputy Dean, Education
Professor Deep Kapur, Deputy Dean, External Engagement and Director, Monash Centre for Financial Studies
Professor Michaela Rankin, Deputy Dean, International and Accreditation
Professor Richard Hall, Deputy Dean, Leadership and Executive Education
Professor Russell Smyth, Deputy Dean, Research
Michelle Clarke, Faculty General Manager
Amanda Michael, Faculty Finance Manager

Heads of Department 

 Professor Abe de Jong, Head, Department of Banking and Finance
 Professor Rob J. Hyndman, Head, Department of Econometrics and Business Statistics
 Professor Gavin Jack, Head, Department of Management
 Professor Hean Tat Keh, Head, Department of Marketing
 Professor Carolyn Sutherland, Head, Department of Business Law and Taxation
 Professor Michael Ward, Head, Department of Economics
 Professor Carla Wilkin, Head, Department of Accounting

Notable faculty 

 Professor Greg J. Bamber
 Professor Eduard Bomhoff
 Professor Maureen Brunt
 Professor Dianne Cook
 Professor Peter Dixon
 Professor Allan Fels
 Professor Rob J. Hyndman
 Professor Hean Tat Keh
 Professor Gael M. Martin
 Professor Yew-Kwang Ng
 Professor Xiaokai Yang
 Professor Yves Zenou

Alumni
Alumni of the Faculty include:

Richard Alston, Former Australian Senator and Minister, current Australian High Commissioner in London
Mark Birrell - Company director, former Minister for Industry, Science and Technology
Julian Burnside QC - High profile barrister, human rights advocate, author
Alastair Clarkson - Former AFL footballer, current coach of the Hawthorn Football Club
Simon Crean MP - Australian Minister for Trade, former Leader of the Opposition and Minister for Employment, Education and Training
Josh Frydenberg MP - Prominent Investment Banker and current federal Member for Kooyong.
Alan Griffiths, former Australian Minister for Industry and Resources
Margaret Jackson AC - Company Director, first female Chairman of Qantas
John Langmore - Politician and author
Lim Guan Eng - Malaysian politician 
Ian Little (1956-2006) - Secretary of the Department of Treasury and Finance, 1998-2006
Michael Luscombe - former CEO, Woolworths
Ian Macfarlane AC - Economist, Governor of the Reserve Bank of Australia, 1996-2006 
Peter Marriott - Chief Financial Officer, Australia and New Zealand Banking Group (ANZ)
Julian McGauran - Australian Senator
Andrew Mohl - Managing Director and CEO, AMP
Stuart Morris, Justice of the Supreme Court of Victoria, President of VCAT
Trevor O'Hoy - President and CEO, Foster's Group
Martin Pakula - Current Victorian Minister for Industry, Trade and Industrial Relations
Pasuk Phongpaichit - Economist, author, anti-corruption campaigner
Peter Reith - Executive Director of the European Bank for Reconstruction and Development, former Defence Minister
Gary P. Sampson - WTO economist
Helen Silver - Secretary of the Victorian Department of Premier and Cabinet

References

Business schools in Australia
Business and Economics